Zam Zam Metro Station is a station in line 3 of the Tehran Metro. The station was formerly known as Qal'eh Morghi Station. In July 2015, the station name was changed to Zam Zam as part of the city council's consideration of polling of the public opinions.

References

Tehran Metro stations
Railway stations opened in 2014
2014 establishments in Iran